The Southern Alps (officially Southern Alps / Kā Tiritiri o te Moana) is a mountain range extending along much of the length of New Zealand's South Island, reaching its greatest elevations near the range's western side. The name "Southern Alps" generally refers to the entire range, although separate names are given to many of the smaller ranges that form part of it.

The range includes the South Island's Main Divide, which separates the water catchments of the more heavily populated eastern side of the island from those on the west coast. Politically, the Main Divide forms the boundary between the Marlborough, Canterbury and Otago regions to the southeast and the Tasman and West Coast regions to the northwest.

Names

The English explorer James Cook bestowed the name Southern Alps on 23 March 1770, admiring their "prodigious height". They had previously been noted by Abel Tasman in 1642, whose description of the South Island's west coast is often translated as "a land uplifted high".

Following the passage of the Ngāi Tahu Claims Settlement Act 1998, the official name of the range was updated to Southern Alps / Kā Tiritiri o te Moana.

Geography

The Southern Alps run approximately 500 km northeast to southwest. The Southern Alps include sixteen other points that exceed  in height (see NZ Mountains by Height). The mountain ranges are bisected by glacial valleys, many of which are infilled with glacial lakes on the eastern side including Lake Coleridge in the north to Lake Wakatipu in Otago in the south.

Settlements include Maruia Springs, a spa near Lewis Pass, the town of Arthur's Pass, and Mount Cook Village.

Major crossings of the Southern Alps in the New Zealand road network include Lewis Pass, Arthur's Pass, Haast Pass, and the road to Milford Sound.

Climate
New Zealand has a humid maritime, temperate climate with the Southern Alps lying perpendicular to the prevailing westerly flow of air. This high precipitation aids the growth of glaciers above the Snow line. Large glaciers and snowfields can be found west of or on the Main Divide, with smaller glaciers farther east (See Glaciers of New Zealand).

Because of its orientation perpendicular to the prevailing westerly winds, the range creates excellent wave soaring conditions for glider pilots. The town of Omarama, in the lee of the mountains, has gained an international reputation for its gliding conditions. The prevailing westerlies also create a weather pattern known as the Nor'west arch, in which moist air is pushed up over the mountains, forming an arch of cloud in an otherwise blue sky. This weather pattern is frequently visible in summer across Canterbury and North Otago. The 'Nor'wester' is a foehn wind similar to the Chinook of Canada, where mountain ranges in the path of prevailing moisture laden winds force air upwards, thus cooling the air and condensing the moisture to rain, producing hot dry winds in the descending air lee of the mountains.

Geology

The Southern Alps lie along a geological plate boundary, part of the Pacific Ring of Fire, with the Pacific Plate to the southeast pushing westward and colliding with the northward-moving Indo-Australian Plate to the northwest.  Over the last 45 million years, the collision has pushed up a 20 km thickness of rocks on the Pacific Plate to form the Alps, although much of this has been eroded away. Uplift has been most rapid during the last 5 million years, and the mountains continue to be raised today by tectonic pressure, causing earthquakes on the Alpine Fault and other nearby faults. Despite the substantial uplift, most of the relative motion along the Alpine Fault is transverse, not vertical. However, significant dip-slip occurs on the plate boundary to the north and east of the North Island, in the Hikurangi Trench and Kermadec Trench. The transfer of motion from strike-slip on the Alpine Fault to dip-slip motion at these subduction zones to the north creates the Marlborough Fault System, which has resulted in significant uplift in the region.

In 2017 a large international team of scientists reported they had discovered beneath Whataroa, a small township on the Alpine Fault, "extreme" hydrothermal activity which "could be commercially very significant".

Flora

The mountains are rich in flora with about 25% of the country's plant species being found above the treeline in alpine plant habitats and grassland with mountain beech forest at lower elevations (of the eastern side but not in Westland). The cold windswept slopes above the treeline are covered with areas of fellfield. To the east, the Alps descend to the Canterbury-Otago tussock grasslands. Plants adapted to the alpine conditions include woody shrubs like Hebe, Dracophyllum, and Coprosma, the conifer snow totara (Podocarpus nivalis) and Carex sedge grasses.

Fauna
Wildlife of the mountains includes the endemic rock wren (Xenicus gilviventris). There are also a number of endemic insects adapted to these high altitudes especially flies, moths, beetles, and bees. The beech forests of the lower elevations are important habitat for two birds; the great spotted kiwi (Apteryx haastii) and the South Island kaka (Nestor meridionalis meridionalis). The Kea can be found in the forested foothills as well as higher, colder elevations. It is the world's only alpine parrot, and was once hunted as a pest.

Threats and preservation
The mountains are inaccessible and retain their natural vegetation. A large proportion of the range is well protected as part of various national parks, notably the Westland Tai Poutini National Park, Mount Aspiring National Park, and Aoraki / Mount Cook National Park or protected areas such as Lake Sumner Forest Park. Indigenous plant life is affected by introduced animals such as red deer (Cervus elaphus), chamois (Rupicapra rupicapra), and Himalayan tahr (Hemitragus jemlahicus) all of which have at times been targeted for culling, while the birds and reptiles are vulnerable to introduced predators.

Panoramic view

References

External links 

 

 
Mountain ranges of Fiordland
Mountain ranges of Canterbury, New Zealand
Mountain ranges of the West Coast, New Zealand
Montane grasslands and shrublands